The Liquidator is a Chinese suspense crime film directed by Xu Jizhou and starring Deng Chao, Ethan Juan and Cecilia Liu. It is based on the novel Evil Minds: City Light written by Lei Mi. The film was released in China on December 22, 2017.

Synopsis
A criminal psychologist (Deng Chao) and a forensic fingerprint expert (Cecilia Liu) work together to track down a serial killer (Ethan Juan) who targets people who have been acquitted of notable crimes and uses their guilt as his modus operandi.

Cast

Main 
Deng Chao as Fang Mu
Wang Kaiyi as young Fang Mu
Ethan Juan as Jiang Ya
Cecilia Liu as Mi Nan

Supporting 
Karena Lam as Wei Wei 
Guo Jingfei as Ren Chuan
Lei Mi
Vicky Chen as Liao Yafan
 He Hongshan as Qi Yuan

Soundtrack

Awards and nominations

See also
Guilty of Mind

References

Chinese suspense films
Chinese crime films
Films based on Chinese novels
2010s Mandarin-language films
2017 crime films
2017 films